Dario Šmitran (born 31 March 1989) is a Slovenian footballer.

References

External links

1989 births
Living people
Slovenian footballers
Association football midfielders
NK Domžale players
ND Gorica players
NK Ivančna Gorica players
NK Celje players
Slovenian PrvaLiga players